Apodia martinii is a moth of the family Gelechiidae. It is found in Germany.

References

Moths described in 1911
Isophrictini
Moths of Europe